The 2012 FIM Mitas Czech Republic Speedway Grand Prix was the third race of the 2012 Speedway Grand Prix season. It took place on May 12 at the Markéta Stadium in Prague, Czech Republic.

The Grand Prix was won by Nicki Pedersen who beat Jason Crump, Tomasz Gollob and Greg Hancock. All four riders was (Hancock is) World Champions.

Riders 
The Speedway Grand Prix Commission nominated Josef Franc as Wild Card, and Václav Milík, Jr. and Matěj Kůs both as Track Reserves. The Draw was made on May 11.

Heat details

Heat after heat 
 (64,25) Sayfutdinov, Crump, Jonsson, Lindbäck
 (64,14) Gollob, Hampel, Holder, Andersen
 (64,65) Hancock, Lindgren, B.Pedersen, Milík (Bjerre M)
 (64,28) Franc, Ljung, Harris, N.Pedersen
 (64,61) Sayfutdinov, Gollob, Bjerre, Ljung
 (64,21) Holder, N.Pedersen, Hancock, Jonsson
 (64,60) Crump, Harris, Lindgren, Hampel
 (64,84) Lindbäck, Andersen, B.Pedersen, Franc
 (65,11) Holder, Sayfutdinov, Lindgren, Franc
 (65,59) Gollob, B.Pedersen, Jonsson, Harris
 (65,72) Crump, N.Pedersen, Andersen, Bjerre
 (65,73) Lindbäck, Hancock, Ljung, Hampel
 (66,03) N.Pedersen, Hampel, Sayfutdinov, B.Pedersen
 (66,70) Andersen, Ljung, Lindgren, Jonsson (R)
 (66,03) Franc, Crump, Hancock, Gollob
 (65,60) Holder, Bjerre, Harris, Lindbäck
 (65,94) Hancock, Harris, Sayfutdinov, Andersen
 (66,17) Franc, Hampel, Jonsson, Bjerre
 (66,45) Crump, B.Pedersen, Holder, Ljung
 (66,21) N.Pedersen, Lindbaeck, Lindbäck, Gollob
 Semifinals
 (66,43) Crump, Hancock, Lindbaeck, Franc
 (65,92) N.Pedersen, Gollob, Holder, Sayfutdinov
 the Final
 (66,50) N.Pedersen, Crump, Gollob, Hancock

The intermediate classification

References

See also 
 motorcycle speedway

Czech Republic
2012
2012 in Czech sport